Public Safety Command Center 112 is a Legal Entity under Public Law (LEPL) of the Ministry of Internal Affairs of Georgia. The command center provides appropriate telephone services for the operational and effective management of emergency service, as well as 24-hour uninterrupted video surveillance throughout the country to provide an efficient instrument to administer crime response and to strengthen road safety. Public Safety Command Center 112 has two PSAPs (Public Safety Answering Points) – in Tbilisi and Rustavi. The Rustavi PSAP opened in 2016 for operational continuity purposes and serves as a backup for the main Tbilisi PSAP.

History  
Prior to the launch of 112 as a single emergency telephone number, there were three independent emergency numbers in Georgia:
Fire and Rescue - 111
Patrol Police - 122
Ambulance – 113

The introduction of 112 as an emergency number had the following advantages: 
One number instead of several existing numbers
High degree of emergency response efficiency
Unified electronic system
Ability to store and analyze information
Ability to monitor emergency service crews
More comfort for locals, as well as, tourists
Recognizable number throughout Europe

Connection channels 

Fixed and mobile phone

It is possible to call 112 from a landline or mobile phone without the postcode and city code, even if the phone is disconnected and the SIM card is not inserted.

Mobile application of 112

112 mobile application is an innovative service, based on modern technologies, the main advantage of which is a function to define a location.

Functions of the application: Silent Alarm - SOS - This feature can be used in situations where the customer may be in danger if making a call. You need to have GPS service enabled to activate SOS function. Pressing the SOS button sends out the coordinates of your location and the police are sent to the shown location.
Correspondence with the operator of 112 (Chat) - This feature can be used in situations where the customer cannot make a call, but rather can answer the questions asked by the operator through the chat.
When using the chat function, in case the user has activated the GPS service, the coordinates determining the location of the initiator will be sent to "112". If you do not have internet connection, information to 112 will be sent via SMS.

A call to 112 - The application allows you to make a call to "112" and at the same time send the coordinates of the location. (You need to have GPS service activated).
•	The app is free. Available in Georgian, English and Russian.
•	The app is adapted and given a sound for the visually impaired.
•	The use of 112 mobile application for improper and / or false notification is strictly prohibited and punished by law!

SMS and Video call service 
Deaf and Hard of hearing community can call 112 via text message and video call in an emergency. The service is free and available throughout Georgia, 24 hours a day.
In order to use the service, pre-registration is required on the website: www.112.gov.ge

The main directions and activities of the center 

Emergency response 
112 receives notifications from all over Georgia, 24 hours a day, via the telephone number 1-1-2 and transfers them to the relevant services: ambulance, police and fire-rescue service. The 112 operators are the only link between the people in the most difficult situations and the emergency services.

National Video Surveillance System and management of administrative Offenses 
Public Safety Command Center "112" provides 24-hour uninterrupted video surveillance throughout the country to provide an efficient instrument to administer crime, crime attempts, and offenses and to strengthen road safety.

Electronic Monitoring System of Domestic Violence
From September 1, 2020, the program of electronic surveillance of the perpetrator entered into force under the legislation of Georgia technically being provided by the Public Safety Command Center 112. In this regard, an electronic monitoring center was set up at the 112, within the scope of which is the implementation of electronic supervision provided by the Law of Georgia on Violence against women and/or elimination of domestic violence, protection and support of victims of violence.

Control of licensed establishments
Public Safety Management Center 112 inspects the video surveillance system installed on the outer perimeter of licensed facilities. The functions of the Center are to establish compliance of this video surveillance system with the requirements of the current legislation and to issue an act on the installation of video surveillance.

Private security activities 
Public Safety Command Center 112 in order to control the security activities, checks the compliance of the security organization, its activities and the guards with the requirements of the law and accordingly imposes responsibility for their violation on the organization, natural and / or legal entity. The control extends to private security facilities throughout the country and aims to ensure the compliance of the activities of private security organizations with the legislation of Georgia.

Evacuator assistance service 
By calling 112, it is possible to use the evacuation assistance service on the territory of Tbilisi. This service meets modern standards. The 112 has up-to-date equipment, which enables rapid response. Parking lots are located in Tbilisi: Digomi and Varketili.

Alternative center  
A new Public Safety Answering Point was opened in Rustavi in 2016. The aim of establishing center had continuity purposes and serves as a backup for the main Tbilisi PSAP. The planning and construction process was carried out in accordance with the recommendations of the best emergency care centers in the world. Adapted work environment for people with special needs, equipped with modern equipment and built to international standards, the call center operates in parallel with the center of Tbilisi.

112 training center 
In 2015, a training center was established at the LEPL 112 of the Ministry of Internal Affairs. The Training Center of Human Resources Management and Development Division of 112 constantly works towards raising the qualification of the existing employees, as well as provides services in this direction for partner entities and different organizations.

International cooperation  
Public Safety Command Center 112 of the Ministry of Internal Affairs of Georgia actively cooperates with different international organizations. 
112 of Georgia is a member European Emergency Number Association (EENA), Public Safety Communication Europe (PSCE), and the International Emergency Management Society (TIEMS).
During the annual award ceremony, organized and conducted by EENA, 112 Georgia, out of 82 countries worldwide, was nominated three times and was awarded twice – in 2015 for “Outstanding Citizen” and in 2016 for “The Best Innovation – SMS and Video Call Service”.

112 day 
February 11 has been declared as 112 Day back since 2009 by the decision of European Council. Events dedicated to 112 Day are conducted worldwide on annual basis. Why February 11?  February 11 is a combination of three digits of the emergency number: 11.02.0000 (dd /mm/ yy). Georgia marks the Day of 112 every year. The celebration includes a large variety of awareness raising activities – meetings at schools and universities, competitions and information campaigns in media to raise the awareness about the single emergency number among the population.

Contact information 
Georgia, Tbilisi, Lisi Street #1a, 0186
Tel: 032 2 41 96 77
https://112.gov.ge/ 
https://www.facebook.com/112.ge

Legal entities
Emergency telephone numbers
Three-digit telephone numbers
Government agencies of Georgia (country)